Giorgi Demurovich Gogiashvili (born 7 January 1971) is a former Georgian professional footballer. He also holds Russian citizenship.

Club career
He made his professional debut in the Pirveli Liga in 1992 for FC Sikharuli-90 Gagra.

He made his Russian Premier League debut for FC Zhemchuzhina Sochi on 17 July 1996 in a game against FC Krylia Sovetov Samara and spent 4 seasons in the RPL with the club.

Honours
 Umaglesi Liga runner-up: 1992, 1995.

References

1971 births
Living people
Footballers from Georgia (country)
FC Samtredia players
FC Zhemchuzhina Sochi players
FC Torpedo Kutaisi players
FC Kolkheti-1913 Poti players
Hapoel Tzafririm Holon F.C. players
FC Neftyanik Ufa players
FC Vostok players
FC Kaisar players
Erovnuli Liga players
Russian Premier League players
Israeli Premier League players
Kazakhstan Premier League players
Naturalised citizens of Russia
Expatriate footballers in Russia
Expatriate footballers in Israel
Expatriate footballers in Kazakhstan
Expatriate sportspeople from Georgia (country) in Russia
Expatriate sportspeople from Georgia (country) in Israel
Expatriate sportspeople from Georgia (country) in Kazakhstan
People from Gagra District
Association football midfielders